Kadomsky District is an administrative and municipal district (raion), one of the twenty-five in Ryazan Oblast, Russia. It is located in the east of the oblast. Its administrative center is the urban locality (a work settlement) of Kadom. Population: 8,494 (2010 Census);  The population of Kadom accounts for 64.5% of the district's total population.

References

Notes

Sources

Districts of Ryazan Oblast